Curry Hill was a K50 ski jumping hill located in Ironwood, Michigan, United States with two official world records set. It was operated by Ironwood Ski Club and Norrie Athletic Club.

History 
The Ironwood Ski Club (organized in 1905) operated the 40 meter Curry Hill ski jump from 1906 through 1914 and the Norrie Athletic Club operated the 50 meter Curry Hill site from 1922 to 1930 when it collapsed after a snow storm.

On 18 February 1912, American James Presthus fell at  world record distance and did not count as record.

Barney Riley crashed that day at 161 and 165 feet, but the order of jumps is not clear, so it is not clear if those two were falls at world record distances or not, depends if those two jumps happened before or after Omtvedt set world record at 169 ft.

Elsewhere in 1915, American Ragnar Omtvedt successfully landed at  world record distance, but did not count as it was set at unofficial event.

Ski jumping world records

 Not recognized! Fall at world record distance.
 Not recognized! Set at professional event. Standing jump.
 Falls! Unclear if set before of after 169 ft? If at WR distances or not?.
 Not recognized! Set at unofficial event. Standing jump.

See also
Wolverine Hill
Copper Peak

References

External links 
 Curry Hill skisprungschanzen.com

Ski jumping venues in the United States
Sports venues in Michigan
Ski areas and resorts in Michigan
Ski jumping venues in Michigan
Hills of the United States
Sports venues completed in 1906
1906 establishments in Michigan